The slender shrew (Sorex gracillimus) is a species of shrew. It is distributed across northeastern North Korea, Hokkaidō, and the Russian Far East including the Kuril Islands.

See also
List of mammals of Korea

References

External links
Zipcode Zoo

Sorex
Mammals of Korea
Mammals described in 1907
Taxa named by Oldfield Thomas